Zygaena contaminei is a species of moth in the Zygaenidae family. It is found in France and Spain.

Technical description and variation (Seitz) 

This species, which is distributed from the Pyrenees to Andalusia,
being more restricted to mountainous districts, corresponds in pattern to scabiosae orion, i. e. the anterior streak is rather short, the central one is separated into a minute basal dot and a large drop-like spot, and the posterior one, though continuous, is strongly constricted in the middle. The very gradually and evenly incrassate, but very strongly clubbed antenna distinguishes this species at once from all forms of scabiosae, with the exception of the small nevadensis, which is, however, much larger, being almost twice the size. 

The larvae feed on Eryngium bourgatii. Adults are on wing from the beginning of July to mid August. The species overwinters in the larval stage. Full-grown larvae can be found from the end of May to mid or end June.

Subspecies
Zygaena contaminei contaminei
Zygaena contaminei almanzorica Reiss, 1936
Zygaena contaminei penalabrica Fernandez, 1929

References

Moths described in 1834
Zygaena
Moths of Europe